Ernst Wasmuth Verlag GmbH & Co. is a publisher based in Tübingen, in southern Germany. The themes of architecture, archaeology, art and design are the key topics of the publishing house, which was established in Berlin in 1872.

History
On May 1, 1872 in Berlin, Ernst Wasmuth (1845-1897) opened a bookstore devoted to architecture, which he soon expanded into publishing. Some of the books he published became classics, including works by Hermann Muthesius and Frank Lloyd Wright. Early in the company history, Wasmuth began to publish two magazines, Der Städtebau (Urban development) and Architektur des XX. Jahrhunderts (Architecture of the 20th Century). 

In 1875, Ernst Wasmuth's younger brother, Emil, entered the business. He died in 1894. In 1905 the company began to publish Georg Dehio's Handbook of German Art History (Der Dehio), which was issued annually to 1928. From 1913 to 1943 Emil Wasmuth's son Günther ran the business in Berlin. Günther Wasmuth founded Wasmuth's Monatshefte für Baukunst (Monthly Architectural Bulletins) in 1914, edited by city planner and author, Werner Hegemann. From 1919 to 1926, Gunther's brother, Ewald Wasmuth, also worked at the company. He left publishing to focus on his own pursuits as a philosopher and translator of such writers as Blaise Pascal.

The publishing house was completely destroyed in an Allied bombing raid in 1943, including the company archive. After World War II, Günther Wasmuth re-established the business in Tübingen while a Wasmuth Antiquarian business was opened in Berlin. The publisher continued to focus on the fields of architecture, art and archeology, to which it now added scientific works and illustrated books. Günther Wasmuth died in 1974. Ernst J. Wasmuth has been the managing director of the company since 1990.

In 1942, a branch of the company opened in Zurich under the name "Fretz & Wasmuth". The publisher produced books for the zones of occupation in Germany that could find no publisher at the time because their authors were discredited. That included, for example, the autobiography of Hans Bernd Gisevius, an avid leader of Nazi injustice, who later became a resistance member by its own account. The company prospects suffered in West Germany after 1945 to 1961 when new editions of earlier publications created larger readerships.

Wasmuth Portfolio

This was the American architect Frank Lloyd Wright's first publication anywhere in the world, as Wright had not published any of his work in his twenty previous years of activity in the United States. It contains plans and linework perspectives of buildings he designed between 1893 and 1909. It is thought that his book, published in German, had an influence on Dutch and German architects in the 1920s; a notable example is the work of the Modernist architect Willem Marinus Dudok.

Orbis Terrarum
Arguably one of its most enduring projects was its series of photo books published in the 1920s under the collective series name of Orbis Terrarum (The World). The company hired noted photographers to visit countries around the world and produced high quality reproductions of the finished products. The series was originally published in German (with German titles and introductory essays and with photo captions in English, French, German, Spanish and Italian). Many titles were later translated into English and French. The following list consists mostly of English language titles in this series and may be incomplete:

Book series
 Bilderhefte des Deutschen Archäologischen Instituts Rom
 Das Deutsche Bürgerhaus
 Germanische Funde aus der Völkerwanderungszeit
 Historische Städtebilder
 Istanbuler Mitteilungen
 Islamische Kunst im Mittelmeerraum
 Kunstwissenschaftliche Schriften der Technischen Universität Berlin
 Orbis Pictus (or: Orbis Pictus / Weltkunst-Bücherei)
 Orbis Terrarum
 Römische Forschungen der Bibliotheca Hertziana
 Römisches Jahrbuch für Kunstgeschichte
 Sonderheften der Berliner Architekturwelt
 Tübinger Studien zur Archäologie und Kunstgeschichte
 Wasmuths Werkkunst-Bücherei

Periodicals, journals
 Atlantis: Länder, Völker, Reisen
 Beiträge zur Bauwissenschaft
 Berliner Architekturwelt: Zeitschrift für Baukunst, Malerei, Plastik und Kunstgewerbe der Gegenwart
 Städtebau Monatshefte für Stadtbaukunst Städtisches Verkehrs- Park- und Siedlungswesen
 Wasmuths Kunsthefte
 Wasmuths Monatshefte für Baukunst

References

Sources
 Eva-Maria Neubert, "100 years of publishing Ernst Wasmuth" in: stock sheets for the German Book Trade, vol. 28, 1972, p. 819f; with 1 facsimile
 N.N., 125 Years Wasmuth. Catalog 9798 (= part of the library of the German Publishers & Booksellers Association e.V.), in: Company chronicle, P. III-XIV, as well as the main Wasmuth Publications from 1872 to 1997, p. XV XXVIII, Tübingen: Wasmuth, 1997
 Roland Jaeger, "The countries of the earth in the image. The series Orbis Terrarum in publishing Ernst Wasmuth, Berlin, and in the Atlantis Verlag, Berlin/Zurich" in: Manfred Heiting, Roland Jaeger (eds.): Autopsy. German Photo-books 1918 to 1945. Volume 1.'' Steidl, Göttingen 2012, p. 98 131.

External links
 Bauornamente der Neuzeit (Vol. 1 of 3, 1881) Kenneth Franzheim II Rare Books Room, William R. Jenkins Architecture and Art Library, University of Houston Digital Library.
 Denkmäler Deutscher Renaissance (Vol. 1 of 8, 1883) Kenneth Franzheim II Rare Books Room, William R. Jenkins Architecture and Art Library, University of Houston Digital Library.
 Barock und Rococo Architektur (Vol. 1, Part 1, 1892) Kenneth Franzheim II Rare Books Room, William R. Jenkins Architecture and Art Library, University of Houston Digital Library.

Book publishing companies of Germany
Publishing companies of Germany
Publishing companies established in 1872
1872 establishments in Germany